En af rikets herrar (in Swedish) or Lord of the Realm was an honorary title introduced by King Gustaf III of Sweden shortly after his bloodless coup d'état in 1772, and after the new constitution was passed by the Riksdag of the Estates. It was first granted to Prince Fredrik Vilhelm von Hessenstein on January 15, 1773.

The title was not hereditary and was not connected with any special function or appointment at court or in public life. It was simply meant as a great honour bestowed upon deserving individuals (noblemen) after years of successful service to the King and the country.

The title gave the holder the same rank as a Privy Councillor and the style Excellency. It could be used as a title in itself, e.g.: "His Excellency The High Well Born Count Axel von Fersen, one of the Lords of the Realm, Knight and Commander of the Orders of His Majesty the King, Commander Grand Cross of the Royal Order of the Sword"

The title was officially dropped on January 10, 1868.

One of the most famous recipients of this title and honour was Count Axel von Fersen the Younger the supposed lover and confidant of Queen Marie Antoinette of France.

Sources 

Swedish titles